Eucithara gruveli is a small sea snail, a marine gastropod mollusk in the family Mangeliidae.

Description
The length of the shell attains 7.1 mm, its diameter 3.1 mm.

Distribution
This marine species occurs off Madagascar.

References

 Dautzenberg P. 1932. Mollusques testacés marins de Madagascar. Supplement.J. Conchyliol. 76(1); 4-119, pI. 1.

External links
  Tucker, J.K. 2004 Catalog of recent and fossil turrids (Mollusca: Gastropoda). Zootaxa 682:1-1295.
 Kilburn R.N. 1992. Turridae (Mollusca: Gastropoda) of southern Africa and Mozambique. Part 6. Subfamily Mangeliinae, section 1. Annals of the Natal Museum, 33: 461–575

gruveli
Gastropods described in 1932